Tapirapuã is a village in the municipality of Barra do Bugres in Mato Grosso, Brazil. It is in the mountainous Serra do Tapirapuã region and next to Sepotuba River.

History 
In the early 20th century, Cândido Mariano da Silva Rondon established a warehouse for his telegraph commission in Tapirapuã which was supplied by motorized boats.

See also 
 Tangará da Serra
Cândido Rondon
Nova Olímpia

References 

Geography of Mato Grosso
Populated places in Mato Grosso